Wallace Lloyd Algie,  (10 June 1891 – 11 October 1918) was a Canadian Expeditionary Force officer and a recipient of the Victoria Cross (VC), the highest award for gallantry in the face of the enemy that can be awarded to British and Commonwealth forces. A soldier with the Canadian Expeditionary Force during the First World War, he was posthumously awarded the VC for his actions on 11 October 1918, during the Hundred Days Offensive.

Early life
Wallace Lloyd Algie was born on 10 June 1891 at Alton in Ontario, Canada, the son of James and Rachel Algie. His father was a medical doctor whose practice covered Peel County, near Toronto. The family later moved to Toronto itself. Algie was educated at Alton Public School and when his schooling was completed, he worked in banking before entering the Royal Military College of Canada. After graduating as a lieutenant, he served initially in The Queen's Own Rifles of Canada and then the 40th Northumberland Regiment. He was known to play the euphonium in the regimental band which was quite common at that time for officers and men of musical inclination.

First World War
In April 1916, Algie enlisted in the Canadian Expeditionary Force, a brother having already volunteered to serve in the First World War. Initially posted to the 95th Battalion, he was later transferred to the 20th Battalion, which arrived in France the following year to join the 4th Canadian Infantry Brigade on the Western Front. He took part in the Battle of Hill 70 and in the subsequent operations around Lens.

On 11 October 1918, during the Hundred Days Offensive, the 4th Brigade was supporting the 6th Infantry Brigade in an attack on the German-held village of Iwuy, north east of Cambrai in France. Aware that German soldiers were bringing up more machine-guns, Algie led a group of volunteers past the battalion's designated area of operations and captured two machine-guns, which were brought to bear on the Germans. In doing so he secured the east end of Iwuy and returned to his lines for reinforcements. He was killed when leading them back to the area under the control of his men. His actions on 11 October contributed to the capture of the entire village later that day, for which he was posthumously awarded the Victoria Cross (VC). The VC, instituted in 1856, was the highest award for valour that could be bestowed on a soldier of the British Empire. The citation that was published in the London Gazette for his VC read:

Victoria Cross
On 28 March 1919, Algie's father was presented with his son's posthumous VC by the Lieutenant Governor of Toronto. The VC was later sold at auction to Lord Ashcroft in 1995 for £17,800, and is on display in the Lord Ashcroft Gallery at the Imperial War Museum. The exact whereabouts of the other medals that Algie was entitled to, the British War Medal and the Victory Medal, are not known but they are most likely in the possession of a collector.

Footnotes

References

External links
 Wallace Lloyd Algie's digitized service file, Library and Archive Canada.
 "In memory of: Lieutenant Wallace Lloyd Algie, October 11, 1918", The Canadian Virtual War Memorial, last modified 25 February 2020.
 Wallace Lloyd Algie, Victoria Cross Recipients, Veterans Affairs Canada, last modified 7 March 2019.
 Arthur Bishop, "Securing Victory", Legion Magazine, 2006.

Royal Military College of Canada alumni
1891 births
1918 deaths
Canadian World War I recipients of the Victoria Cross
Canadian military personnel killed in World War I
People from Caledon, Ontario
Queen's Own Rifles of Canada officers
Canadian Expeditionary Force officers
Queen's York Rangers (1st American Regiment)